Who Is the Savage? is a lost 1913 silent dramatic short directed, written by, and starring Romaine Fielding with Mary Ryan. Moving Picture World gave it a favorable writeup, calling it a comedic farce. The plot featured a white woman stealing the child of an "Indian" woman. This storyline caused some controversy with some critics. It was a Lubin film.

Moving Picture World gave it a favorable write up, calling it a comedic farce.

Cast
Romaine Fielding - Mr. Van Vechten
Mary Ryan - Mrs. Van Vechten
Belle Bennett - Mrs. Norris

References

External links
 Who Is the Savage? at IMDb.com

1913 films
1913 short films
American silent short films
Lubin Manufacturing Company films
American black-and-white films
Films directed by Romaine Fielding
Lost American films
Silent American drama films
1913 drama films
1913 lost films
Lost drama films
1910s American films
1910s English-language films
American drama short films